Răut, also referred to as Reut (Ukrainian and  (Reut),  (Revet)) is a river in Moldova, a right tributary of Dniester. Răut, generally navigable until the 18th-19th century, is navigable today only by small recreational boats.

The towns Bălți, Orhei, and Florești are located by the river.

References

Rivers of Moldova